The Croatian Vilayet was a temporary borderland entity in Dalmatia in the 16th century. Its capital was Sinj.

Establishment and territory 
Immediately after the Ottoman capture of the Dalmatian hinterland and Lika from the Kingdom of Croatia and the Republic of Venice in the 1520s, they organized it as a borderland entity and named it the Vilayet of "Croats". The southern border of the territory of this vilayet was river Cetina while north-western border was Lika and river Zrmanja. It also included region around river Krka. This territory was administratively governed as the Croatian vilayet which belonged to the Sanjak of Bosnia and listed as such in its 1530 defter (tax registry).

Administration 
The capital of the vilayet was Sinj. Its territory was under the jurisdiction of the Skradin kadiluk. Aličić claimed that territories of the Croatian vilayet and Skradin kadiluk were the same and that the official Ottoman administrative unit, Croatian vilayet, was under administrative-judicial jurisdiction of Skradin.

In 1528 the Croatian vilayet and kadiluk of Skradin had the following nahiyahs:

 Sinj and Cetina
 Dicmo
 Zminje Polje
 Vrhrika
 Petrovo Polje and Petrova Gora (with seat in Drniš)
 Kosovo
 Nečven
 Strmica
 Plavna Popina
 Knin
 Grahovo
 Zečevo
 Skradin
 Zrmanja
 Ostrovica
 Benkovac
 Bukovica
 Kličevac
 Karin
 Nadin
 Obrovac
 Podgorje

The first governor of the Croatian vilayet was Malkoč-beg. Around 1537 the governor of the Croatian vilayet was Mahmud Bey. Many soldiers from the vilayet participated at the Battle of Mohács. Most of the Ottoman soldiers registered before the battle were labelled as Bosnians or Croats, designating the territory they were recruited at. All of them had Muslim names, which proves that the process of Islamization of the newly conquered population was much faster than earlier assumed.

The Croatian vilayet was disestablished when it was annexed by the newly established Sanjak of Klis in 1537.

Annotations

References

Sources

Further reading 
 
 Anali: Gazi Husrev-Begove Biblioteke . 2013, Vol. 34, pp. 103–115. 13p.

Vilayets of the Ottoman Empire in Europe
Ottoman period in the history of Croatia
16th century in Croatia
History of Dalmatia
1520s establishments in the Ottoman Empire
16th-century disestablishments in the Ottoman Empire
1537 disestablishments in Europe
1520s in Croatia